Air Marshal Sir Geoffrey William Tuttle,  (2 October 1906 – 11 January 1989) was a senior Royal Air Force officer who served as Deputy Chief of the Air Staff from 1956 to 1959.

RAF career
Tuttle joined the Royal Air Force in 1925. He was appointed Officer Commanding No. 105 Squadron in 1937. He served in World War II as Commander of the Photographic Reconnaissance Unit and then as Officer Commanding No. 324 Wing before being appointed Senior Air Staff Officer at Headquarters Mediterranean Allied Coastal Air Force and then Air Officer Commanding AHQ Greece. In Greece his initial force consisted of Nos 94, 108, and 221 Squadrons. After the War he became Director of Operational Requirements at the Air Ministry and then Air Officer for Administration at Headquarters RAF Coastal Command. He went on to be Assistant Chief of the Air Staff (Operational Requirements) in 1951, Air Officer Commanding No. 19 Group in 1954 and Deputy Chief of the Air Staff in 1956 before retiring in 1959.

In retirement Tuttle became General Manager at Vickers-Armstrongs (Aviation) Limited.

References

External links

1906 births
1989 deaths
Commandeurs of the Légion d'honneur
Companions of the Order of the Bath
Knights Commander of the Order of the British Empire
Recipients of the Croix de Guerre 1939–1945 (France)
Recipients of the Distinguished Flying Cross (United Kingdom)
Royal Air Force air marshals
Royal Air Force personnel of World War II